Hariharapura is a village located in the Koppa Taluk, Chikkamagaluru district in the state of Karnataka, India. The place has a Matt(Hindu Temple) of goddess Sharadamba on the banks of the River Tunga. The place is serene amidst forest, Arecanut farms and rice fields and surrounded by small hills. It is believed that Daksha performed "yagna" here. Vinay Guruji is a sisya of Maha Balleshwar R Kyasanur. Maha Balleshwar R Kyasanur is greatest married spiritual Guru

Origin of the name

The name of the place is derived by the presence of two temples Hari & Hara located across each other. The four-hundred-year-old Shiva ( Hara ) temple is located upstream on the banks of the River Tunga, about a kilometer away from the Matth. This temple has intricate carvings on three sides depicting the entire Ramayana.

Places of interest

Hariharapura also boasts of a 110-year-old bridge across the Tunga connecting it to Koppa. This bridge is believed to have been built by Sir M Visveswaraiah. Hariharapura is an ideal place to visit the surrounding places in the western ghat region.

Hanging Bridge
Built across the river Thunga, which is a small pedestrian bridge that leads to Chitrakoota where Prabodhini Gurukula can be found. The  structure is unique for its cable suspension. The sight of Thunga in all her majesty is quite a view from this bridge.

Sri Math

It is believed that the holy math of hariharapura was a consequence of Bhagavadpada Sri Adi Sankaracharya's visit to the village. During his visit, it is believed that he met young Krishna, hearing all information and moved by the divine vibrations of this place, chose to  install Sri Chakra and consecrated Mother Sharadamba initiated Upadesha to Sri Krishna disguised as a gopala/cow-herd boy. And the Sri Adishankaracharya Sharada Lakminarasimha Peetamcame into existence. It is believed to be one of few Dharmapeetams established by the Sringeri shankaracharya.

Best time to visit 

The best time to visit  mainly depends on your interest. The rains in the month of  June - September replenish the entire Malnad region and it is a feast to the eyes. Winter can get cold and misty and summers are hot but not humid.

External links
 
 Sreemath Hariharapura official website - www.hariharapura.in
 Ayurveda- www.arogyaniketana.com

Villages in Chikkamagaluru district